Thomas Palasor (c. 1570 - 9 August 1600) was an English Roman Catholic priest. He is a Catholic martyr, beatified in 1987.

Life
Palasor was born at Ellerton-on-Swale, parish of Catterick, North Riding of Yorkshire.  He arrived at Reims on 24 July 1592, and set out for the English College, Valladolid on 24 August 1592. There, he was ordained priest in 1596.

He was arrested in the house of John Norton, of Ravensworth, nearly Lamesley, County Durham. Norton seems to have been the second son of Richard Norton, of Norton Conyers, attainted for his share in the Rising of the North in 1569. Norton and his wife (if the identification is correct, she was his second wife, Margaret, daughter of Christopher Redshaw of Owston) were arrested at the same time, with a noble English gentleman, the Blessed John Talbot, one of the Talbots of Thornton-le-Street, North Riding of Yorkshire.

All four were tried at Durham and condemned to death, Palasor for being a priest, and the others for assisting him. Another gentleman was condemned at the same time but saved his life by conforming to the Church of England, as the others might have done. Mrs. Norton, being supposed to be with child, was reprieved. The three others were executed together.

Richard Challoner tells how an attempt to poison Palasor and his companions made by the jailer's wife resulted in the conversion of her maid-servant Mary Day. Thomas Palasor, John Norton and John Talbot were beatified as members of the Eighty-five martyrs of England and Wales by Pope John Paul II at the Vatican on 22 November, 1987.

See also
 Douai Martyrs

Notes

References

Attribution

1600 deaths
16th-century English Roman Catholic priests
English beatified people
17th-century venerated Christians
Year of birth unknown
16th-century births
16th-century Roman Catholic martyrs
Eighty-five martyrs of England and Wales
People executed under Elizabeth I
People from Catterick, North Yorkshire
Executed people from North Yorkshire